Eremophila veronica, commonly known as veronica-like eremophila, is a flowering plant in the figwort family, Scrophulariaceae and is endemic to Western Australia. It is a low, spreading shrub with small, crowded leaves and lilac-coloured flowers which have a short petal tube and spreading petal lobes.

Description
Its branches are densely hairy and sometimes sticky to touch near their tips. The leaves are arranged in whorls of 3 around the branches, crowded and appearing in rows along the branches.

The flowers are borne singly in leaf axils and lack a stalk. The petal tube is lilac-coloured on the outside and white with lilac spots inside. The petal tube and lobes are glabrous on both surfaces except for the lower lobe which has short, flattened hairs and the inside of the tube which is filled with long, soft hairs. The 4 stamens extend slightly beyond the end of the petal tube.

Taxonomy and naming 
The species was first formally described in 1899 by Spencer Le Marchant Moore who gave it the name Pholidia veronica. The description was published in Journal of the Linnean Society, Botany. In 1931, Charles Gardner changed the name to Eremophila veronica and published the name change in Enumeratio plantarum Australiae Occidentalis. The specific epithet (veronica) presumably refers to the similarity of this species to those in the genus Veronica.

Distribution and habitat 
This eremophila occurs in the Coolgardie area in the Coolgardie and Murchison biogeographic regions growing in rocky clay soil in low Eucalyptus woodland.

Conservation
Eremophila veronica is classified as "Priority Three" by the Western Australian Government Department of Parks and Wildlife meaning that it is poorly known and known from only a few locations but is not under imminent threat.

Use in horticulture
This shrub is an ornamental plant, even when not covered with its small pale blue flowers. It can be propagated from cuttings and grows best in well-drained soil in full sun. It only needs an occasional watering during a long dry spell and is very frost tolerant.

References

Eudicots of Western Australia
veronica
Endemic flora of Western Australia
Plants described in 1899
Taxa named by Spencer Le Marchant Moore